The 1934 New Mexico gubernatorial election took place on November 6, 1934, in order to elect the Governor of New Mexico. Incumbent Democrat Andrew W. Hockenhull, who had succeeded to the governorship in 1933 following the death of Arthur Seligman, did not run for election to a full term.

General election

Results

References

gubernatorial
1934
New Mexico
November 1934 events